Albanerpeton is an extinct genus of salamander-like lissamphibian found in North America and Europe, first appearing in Cretaceous-aged strata. There are eight described members of the genus, and one undiagnosed species from the Paskapoo Formation, with the most recent, A. ektopistikon being described by Carrano et al.in 2022. Members of the genus had a robust head and neck which likely allowed them to actively burrow, characteristic of fossorial species, and they lived in a wide range of environments. This genus of amphibian was the last of its order, surviving until the late Pliocene in southern Europe, and into the Early Pleistocene (Gelasian) of northern Italy. It likely became extinct when the region developed its present Mediterranean-type climate, having preferred one that was cold and humid. The monophyly of Albanerpeton has recently been questioned

History and Discovery
Albanerpeton was first described by Estes and Hoffstetter in 1976. However, the genus was re-described by Gardner in 1999 after a large collection of jaws and frontals from Miocene fissure fills near La Grive-Saint-Alban in southeastern France was found. When the type species was originally described, it was considered to be a salamander, despite possessing no known features that were otherwise restricted to Urodela, as its only salamander-like features were held in common with small, limbed, and non-saltatorial amphibians in general. A. inexpectatum had many unique characteristics, distinct from salamanders and other amphibians (such as its feeding apparatus, dermal bones of the skull, and anterior cervical vertebrae) that Fox and Naylor suggested it be classified in its own order, Allocaudata, family, Albanerpetontidae, and genus, Albanerpeton, all of which were new at the time. Seven of the eight species are restricted to the Western Interior of North America, suggesting that the evolutionary history of the genus was centered there, although the presence of a sole species in France, A. inexpectatum, suggests a Tertiary dispersal of an unknown species from North America into Europe. Albanerpeton jaws and frontals are the most commonly recovered Albanerpeton bones found at dig sites, but these bones exhibit many characteristics that are taxonomically and phylogenetically informative for the genus and individual species within it.

Geology and palaeoenvironment 
The description of A. arthridion by Gardner in 1999 established a minimum age of latest Aptian for Albanerpetontidae's establishment in North America. A later paper by Gardner in the same year, in which he described A. cifelli, helped fill missing information in the genus’ record during the Cretaceous period.  The finding and description of A. pannonicus in 2005 extended the genus’ temporal range from the middle Miocene to the early Pliocene.

In 2018, Villa et al. investigated fossil herpetofauna and the palaeoenvironment in Northern Italy's town of Rivoli Veronese. The investigation supported the hypothesis that Albanerpeton favored a moist environment, and confirmed the former presence of a humid, forested landscape on Po Plain's northern side in the Gelasian, supporting the genus’ preference for humid environmental conditions, and also further extended the genus’ temporal range to the Gelasian period. The discovery and description of a new Albanerpetontidae species, who is closely related to genus Albanerpeton, from the Kuwajima Formation in Japan, Shirepeton isajii, further extends the group into Asia, though the genus Albanerpeton has still only been found in North America and Europe.

Description 
Albanerpeton are distinct from frogs, salamanders, and caecilians, forming their own family of Lissamphibia, Albanerpetontidae. Membership of species in the family is determined by diagnostic character states of the frontals and premaxillary synapomorphies, both of which can be used to further diagnose less inclusive clades in the genus. These less inclusive clades are the gracile-snouted clade and robust-snouted clade, made up of three and four species respectively though only three of the robust-snouted clade have been fully described. The gracile-snouted clade is defined by a triangular to slit-shaped suprapalatal pit. The robust-snouted clade is defined by a robust premaxillae, a short pars dorsalis that is sutured dorsally with the nasal, a short premaxillary lateral process on the maxilla, and an internasal process on frontals that are both narrow and similar to spines. The origins of these sister, snout-based clades can both be traced back to the early Late Cretaceous, and therefore antedate the Campanian.  A. arthridion is interpreted as the most primitive species of Albanerpeton, being quite small. Its small size forms the basis for the hypothesis that reduced body size is derived, and was developed at least twice within the genus. Diagnostic characteristics of the genus itself include characteristics of the teeth and skull.

Dentition
Albanerpeton teeth are about one-third of the distance from the anterior end of the tooth row, and these are markedly larger than other nearby teeth. Additionally, the dorsal edge of the dental boundary is curved on its lingual side.

Skull
In 2013, Maddin et al. created a computer-generated tomography of a partially preserved, three-dimensional A. pannonicum neurocranium which deposited during the Pliocene in Hungary. The structure of this specimen is in line with what is known of older Albanerpeton neurocrania, and therefore a good reference for what the neurocranium of the whole genus is like. Features of the reconstructed skull consist of a robust, box-like unit composed of coossification of the parasphenoid, otic capsules, and occipital elements with no trace of fusion or sutural points of contact among these components. Additionally, the anterior three-quarters of the dorsal surface is open, but the furthest posterior portion, tectum synoticum, is fused. The ventral surface of Albanerpeton neurocrania are fully ossified, solid bone. The neurocranium of Albanerpeton is in contact dorsally with paired parietals, forming the roof of the brain cavity while contacting laterally with the squamosal. Overall, the robust construct of Albanerpeton's neurocranium is consistent with the theory that the genus was fossorial in nature, as the thickened and strengthened skull would have lent itself to burrowing.  

Albanerpeton have ossified antotic pillars which sit in front of the otic capsules. Additionally, there are a pair of small, robust bony pedestals that are located ventrolaterally in front of the otic capsules, which likely served to brace the neurocranium against the palatal region and suspensorium. In Albanerpeton, the otic capsules themselves are moderately inflated with a large, rhomboid-shaped fenestra vestibuli present on both capsules. These fenestrae can be used to imply the presence of middle ear ossicles in Albanerpeton. Albanerpeton had well-developed semicircular canals with a modestly developed ventral auditory region as well.

Classification
Current accepted species:

Genus Albanerpeton Estes & Hoffstetter 1976

 Albanerpeton arthridion Fox & Naylor 1982 Early Cretaceous, United States
 Albanerpeton ektopistikon Carrano et al. 2022 Early Cretaceous, North America
 Clade "Gracile-snouted"
 Albanerpeton gracilis Gardner 2000 Late Cretaceous, North America
 Albanerpeton cifellii Gardner 1999 Late Cretaceous, United States
 Albanerpeton galaktion Fox & Naylor 1982 Late Cretaceous, North America
 Clade "Robust-snouted"
 Albanerpeton nexuosus Estes 1981 Late Cretaceous, North America
 Albanerpeton pannonicus Venczel & Gardner 2005 Latest Miocene-Early Pleistocene Hungary, Italy
 Albanerpeton inexpectatum Estes & Hoffstetter 1976 Early Oligocene-Late Miocene, Europe

The genus Albanerpeton is part of the family Albanerpetontidae which is part of the order Allocaudata within superorder Batrachia and class Amphibia. Members of genus Albanerpeton are considered to be Lissamphibia who are distinct in character from frogs, salamanders, and caecilians. In 2018, a closely related species, named Shirepeton isajii, was discovered and described in the Kuwajima Formation of Japan. While it is closely related to members of Albanerpeton, it does not fall within the clade. Many remains attributed to Albanerpeton from the Late Cretaceous of Europe, such as those from the Maastrichtian aged Densuş-Ciula Formation, Sânpetru Formation and Sard Formation of Romania and the Maastrichtian aged Tremp Formation of Spain, are probably only diagnostic to family level.

Cladogram from Venczel and Gardner (2005):

In 2020 it was found that Albanerpeton is paraphyletic with respect to Shirerpeton and Yaksha, and it has been suggested that Albanerpeton be restricted to the Cenozoic species, with the Cretaceous species being given separate genera.

Cladogram from Daza et al. (2020)

Finally, with the description of Albanerpeton ektopistikon by Carrano et al. (2022), based on the data matrix from the 2018 description of Shirepeton isajii, also recovered Albanerpeton as a paraphiletic genus,  further separated than in Daza et al., (2020). Instead of restricting  Albanerpeton, they suggested to include Shirerpeton and Wesserpeton into the genus, turning their type species into  A. isajii and  A. evansae, respectively.  Cladogram from Carrano et al. (2022):

References

Further reading 
 Delfino, M. and Sala, B. 2007. Late Pliocene Albanerpetontidae (Lissamphibia) from Italy. Journal of Vertebrate Paleontology 27(3):716–719
Fossil Salamanders of North America (Life of the Past) by J. Alan Holman

Albanerpetontidae
Prehistoric amphibians of North America
Cretaceous amphibians of North America
Paleogene amphibians of North America
Neogene amphibians of North America
Prehistoric amphibian genera
Paleocene amphibians
Eocene amphibians
Oligocene amphibians
Miocene amphibians
Pliocene amphibians
Pleistocene amphibians
Laramie Formation
Milk River Formation
La Huérguina Formation
Fossil taxa described in 1976
Fossil taxa described in 2005
Prehistoric life of Europe
Fossils of France
Fossils of Japan
Fossils of the United States